Serbia is mountainous, with complex geology and parts of several mountain ranges: Dinaric Alps in the southwest, the northwestern corner of the Rila-Rhodope Mountains in the southeast of the country, Carpathian Mountains in the northeast, and Balkan Mountains and the easternmost section of Srednogorie mountain chain system in the east, separated by a group of dome mountains along the Morava river valley. The northern province of Vojvodina lies in the Pannonian plain, with several Pannonian island mountains. Mountains of Kosovo are listed in a separate article.

List
This is the list of mountains and their highest peaks in Serbia, excluding Kosovo. When a mountain has several major peaks, they are listed separately.

Peaks over 2,000 meters

The following lists only those mountain peaks which reach over 2,000 meters in height.

Notes

References

See also

 Geography of Serbia
 List of rivers in Serbia
 List of lakes in Serbia
 List of hills in Belgrade
 Dinaric Alps

External links
 Staze i Bogaze – A Guide Through Mountains of Balkans 

Mountains in Serbia
 
Serbia
Mountains
Serbia